Woman's Day is an American women's monthly magazine that covers such topics as homemaking, food, nutrition, physical fitness, physical attractiveness, and fashion. The print edition is one of the Seven Sisters magazines. The magazine was first published in 1931 by The Great Atlantic & Pacific Tea Company; the current publisher is Hearst Corporation.

History
A&P began publishing the U.S. edition as a free in-store menu/recipe planner, calculated to make customers buy more by giving them meal ideas in an easy-to-read format available inside A&P grocery stores.

Following the 1936 opening of A&P's first modern supermarket (in Braddock, Pennsylvania), A&P expanded Woman's Day in 1937 through a wholly owned subsidiary, the Stores Publishing Company. Selling for five cents a copy (¢ today), the magazine featured articles on childcare, crafts, food preparation and cooking, home decoration, needlework and health, plus a revival of cartoonist Walter Hoban's Jerry on the Job comic strip in a 1939 Grape-Nuts ad campaign.

Sold exclusively in A&P stores, Woman's Day had a circulation of 3,000,000 by 1944. This had reached 4,000,000 by the time A&P sold the magazine to Fawcett Publications in 1958. By 1965, Woman's Day had climbed to a circulation of 6,500,000.

In a mid-1960s appeal to Madison Avenue, an ad for Woman's Day showed a friendly pharmacist named I.A. Morse next to copy that claimed:

Fawcett was sold to CBS in 1977, and CBS, in turn, sold its magazine division to a group led by division head Peter Diamandis, who renamed the group Diamandis Communications. In 1988 Woman's Day, along with the rest of Diamandis, was acquired by Hachette Filipacchi Médias which published the magazine from offices at 1633 Broadway in New York. Hearst Magazines bought the Hachette magazines in the US in 2011.

Editors
Mabel Hill Souvaine (1943–1957)
Eileen Tighe (1957–1966)
Geraldine Rhoads (1966–1982)
Ellen Levine (1982–1991)
Jane Chesnutt (1991–2010)
Elizabeth Mayhew (2010-2012)
Susan Spencer (2012–2020)
Meaghan Murphy (2020–present)

See also 
 List of women's magazines
 List of men's magazines

References

External links

United We Stand: John Clymer cover for July 1942 issue

Monthly magazines published in the United States
Women's magazines published in the United States
Food and drink magazines
The Great Atlantic & Pacific Tea Company
Hearst Communications publications
Magazines established in 1931
Magazines published in New York City
Fawcett Publications